Major General (Thomas) Herbert Shoubridge CB, CMG, DSO (1871–1923) was a British Army officer who became Commandant of the Royal Military College, Sandhurst.

Military career
Shoubridge was commissioned into the Dorset Regiment as a second lieutenant on 5 March 1893. He was promoted to lieutenant on 18 June 1896, and took part in the Tirah expedition to the North West Frontier of India in 1897. Following the outbreak of the Second Boer War in late 1899, he became deputy assistant adjutant general for the Natal Army. He transferred to the Northumberland Fusiliers and was promoted captain on 9 May 1900, and received a brevet promotion as major dated 29 November 1900 in the South African Honours list of 1901. After the war ended in June 1902, he became Deputy Assistant Quartermaster General at Headquarters, South Africa Command. He was appointed brigade major for the 13th Brigade in 1906 and then served as a general staff officer with Western Command and then Southern Command.

He fought in World War I as assistant adjutant and quartermaster general for 2nd Army Corps from 1914 and as assistant quartermaster general for 4th Army Corps from 1915. He was appointed Commander of 54th Infantry Brigade in France later that year. He went on to be General Officer Commanding 7th Infantry Division in 1917 and General Officer Commanding of 42nd (East Lancashire) Infantry Division from 1919 and was then briefly Commandant of the Royal Military College Sandhurst in 1923 before his resignation due to ill health. He lived at Lawrenny Castle near Kilgetty in Pembrokeshire.

Family
In 1910 he married Constance Gladys Dugdale; they had a daughter and a son.

References

External links

|-

|-

1871 births
1923 deaths
British Army major generals
Dorset Regiment officers
Royal Northumberland Fusiliers officers
Companions of the Order of the Bath
Companions of the Order of St Michael and St George
Companions of the Distinguished Service Order
British military personnel of the Tirah campaign
British Army personnel of the Second Boer War
British Army generals of World War I
Commandants of Sandhurst